Driftwood is a 1947 American drama film produced and directed by Allan Dwan and starring Ruth Warrick, Walter Brennan, Dean Jagger and Charlotte Greenwood. The movie also features Natalie Wood as a little orphan girl who adopts a collie. It was produced by Republic Pictures, the largest Hollywood company outside the major studios, as a more prestigious release than the low-budget westerns and crime films that Republic specialized in.

Plot
  
The story opens with Rev. J. Hollingsworth delivering a sermon from the pulpit of his church. As the view widens, we see a young girl, Jenny Hollingsworth, listening with rapt attention. As the Reverend continues, his speech begins to falter, and Jenny helps him out by continuing a quotation from scripture that he had begun. The Reverend can soon no longer continue, though, and joins Jenny in her pew. Jenny addresses him as "Grandpappy," so we understand the relationship between the two. By this point we realize that Jenny is the only member of the congregation, and the church seems to have been otherwise abandoned. Grandpappy then dies.

We next see Jenny trudging down a road through what appears to be desert. She is intermittently singing and talking to herself. We then see an airplane with one engine on fire descending through the night air, with an explosion following. Jenny refers to the fiery figure in the sky as "Beelzebub". Soon after the crash, a collie appears, and begins walking with Jenny. Along with the dog, Jenny finds a placard identifying the type of airplane that crashed, and she takes this with her. Dr. Steve Webster then appears along the road, driving his Jeep, and comes across Jenny and the dog, and invites them into his vehicle. Jenny spends the night with Dr. Webster in the home that he shares with Murph, the local pharmacist. Murph is surprised and initially somewhat upset when he discovers Jenny sleeping on the sofa the next morning, with the dog at her side. We then discover that Dr. Webster is conducting research on Rocky Mountain spotted fever, and has a number of infected ticks on his porch, making his home a dangerous place for a young girl. We also learn that he has applied for a grant to teach and study at an institute in San Francisco, and that he is hoping to hear a positive response from them via the mail any day now. Murph gives Jenny a much-needed bath, during which he fills her in on some of the back stories behind the local characters in town, along with some of his folksy philosophy about men and women and marriage.

Dr. Webster takes Jenny to meet his friend Susan Moore, who is living with Mathilda. Mathilda gives Steve and Susan an earful, letting us know that she thinks Steve is a hopeless dreamer, and that Susan is silly to continue waiting for him to propose to her. Jenny, who has grown up with her great-grandfather in isolation, has learned that it is important to tell the truth, and takes most things very literally. She then tells Mathilda what she thinks of her, along with some of what Murph has shared, resulting in Mathilda becoming upset and directing Steve to remove Jenny and the dog from her sight. Steve takes Jenny to Murph's pharmacy for a sundae, but the place is crowded with local children waiting for entrance to the movie house next door, and some of the children are unkind to Jenny, making her feel ashamed of the makeshift dress she is wearing. The ringleader is the mayor's son, who is genuinely cruel to her. When Steve is talking to Murph we learn that Murph has laid in a large stock of vaccine to prevent people from getting the Rocky Mountain spotted fever, but that Steve has not been able to convince the locals to have the vaccine administered to their children. We also learn that the local mayor has influenced the town to build a new park instead of a much-needed hospital, and that the nearest hospital is fifty miles away. Steve then decides that Jenny must have some new clothes to wear, and takes her to another local store to purchase them. He doesn't have enough money to pay for them, though, but arranges to trade tonsillectomies for the three children of the proprietor for Jenny's new clothes, of which she is very proud.

Dr. Webster is called away to attend to a sick boy, Clem Perkins. We learn that Clem has contracted spotted fever. Steve tells Clem's father that they should have had the boy vaccinated earlier, but that there is no medicine now to cure the disease, and that he must simply wait and hope for the best. While Steve is away, Jenny is walking home with her dog, and the mayor's son comes across them, and threatens Jenny. The dog then growls and chases the boy away, catching him and pulling down his pants, but not damaging anything other than the boy's inflated ego. When Steve and Jenny are both back at Murph and Steve's home, the mayor shows up with a gun, saying he is going to shoot the dog. Steve forcefully evicts the mayor from his home but, in the process, the mayor stumbles and falls on the porch, freeing the infected ticks. Steve warns Jenny to stay away from the porch, while Steve tries to secure the area, but Jenny walks through the porch, and we see Jenny rubbing a sore spot on her leg, letting us (but not Steve) know that she has been bitten by one of the ticks. Sheriff Bolton comes to arrest the dog, saying that the dog will be given a fair trial, but must remain in jail until the trial. Jenny weeps, afraid that her dog will be killed. Clem Perkins dies. The parents in town now all send their children to Steve's house to be vaccinated, and a long line forms. Susan and Mathilda both come over to help, and Murph brings more vaccine from his pharmacy. Steve starts to vaccinate Jenny at some point, but is interrupted, and never completes the procedure.

The dog's trial takes place. Steve is unavailable to act as defense attorney, and so Murph takes over. The mayor and his counsel insist that the dog bit the mayor's son. Jenny testifies, but is unable to persuade the judge on her own that the dog is innocent. The judge initially rules that the dog must be put down. However, Steve then shows up, and insists that the Mayor's son receive a medical examination to determine the extent of his alleged injuries. Murph, Steve and the judge them summarily subject the boy to a visual examination, with all three agreeing that he shows no sign of injuries to his posterior. The judge then reverses his decision, but declares that the dog must be kept under observation at the jail, to ensure that he is not diseased. Jenny now falls ill, and Steve confirms that she has spotted fever. Her fever begins to grow. Steve says there is nothing to do but hope for the best. Some of the other characters, however, insist that when nothing else can be done, prayer may work.

At this point Steve learns of the news of the plane crash, and discovers that the plane was carrying a dog to Colorado for use in creating a serum to cure Rocky Mountain spotted fever, since the dog had been sick but had recovered, and so had developed powerful antibodies to the disease. They then conclude that Jenny's dog is actually the dog from the airplane, and that Steve and Murph can make a serum from the dog's blood. They don't know how much of the serum to give her, though, so they try to contact the institute responsible for the dog and the serum—the same institute to which Steve had applied. However the Institute tells them that Dr. Nicholas Adams is the only person who can answer their question, and he can't be reached, since he is driving to Colorado. Steve asks the local radio station to broadcast an emergency alert, and Dr. Adams hears it, and calls, and they found out the correct dosage just in time to administer the serum and cure Jenny.

Dr. Adams then arrives on the scene. At breakfast the next day, he awards Steve with a $5,000 grant to continue his studies of spotted fever. Steve announces that he will stay in town, will marry Susan, and will adopt Jenny. Dr. Adams says that they have drawn enough blood from the dog to serve their purposes, and so relinquish their claim on him, leaving him to round out the happy home forming with Steve, Susan and Jenny. Murph and Mathilda even seem on the verge of getting hitched, and so all ends happily.

Cast
Ruth Warrick as Susan Moore
Walter Brennan as Murph
Dean Jagger as Dr. Steve Webster
Charlotte Greenwood as Mathilda
Natalie Wood as Jenny Hollingsworth
Jerome Cowan as Mayor Snyder
H. B. Warner as Rev. J. Hollingsworth / "Grandpappy"
Margaret Hamilton as Essie Keenan
Hobart Cavanaugh as Judge Beckett
Francis Ford as Abner Green
Alan Napier as Dr. Nicholas Adams
Howland Chamberlain as Hiram Trumbell
James Bell as Sheriff Bolton
Teddy Infuhr as Lester Snyder
James Kirkwood as Rev. MacDougal
Ray Teal as Clem Perkins

Critical response
On February 1, 2018, Richard Brody of The New Yorker praised Driftwood as an "electrifying, eccentric masterwork" from director Allan Dwan, a film that has a "near-journalistic devotion to detail" and "both typifies and expands Dwan’s core inspiration: his dramatization of a thick tangle of social connections and conflicting lines of power and passion that seemingly bring the town itself to life along with its individual characters." Brody also commented that the character of Jenny Hollingsworth is "one of the most idiosyncratic and original child characters I’ve seen in a Hollywood movie".

Restoration
A new restoration of Driftwood by Paramount Pictures, The Film Foundation, and Martin Scorsese was screened at the Museum of Modern Art (MoMA) on February 2, 2018. The screening was part of the museum's program of showcasing 30 restored films from the library of Republic Pictures curated by Scorsese.

References

External links

1947 drama films
1947 films
American black-and-white films
American drama films
Films about orphans
Films directed by Allan Dwan
Films scored by Nathan Scott
Films set in Nevada
Republic Pictures films
1940s American films
1940s English-language films